The following is a list of the 333 communes of the Ille-et-Vilaine department of France.

The communes cooperate in the following intercommunalities (as of 2020):
Rennes Métropole
CA Fougères Agglomération
Communauté d'agglomération du Pays de Saint-Malo
CA Redon Agglomération (partly)
CA Vitré Communauté
CC Bretagne Porte de Loire Communauté
Communauté de communes Bretagne Romantique
Communauté de communes de Brocéliande
Communauté de communes Côte d'Émeraude (partly)
Communauté de communes Couesnon Marches de Bretagne
CC Liffré-Cormier Communauté
CC Montfort Communauté
Communauté de communes du Pays de Châteaugiron
Communauté de communes du Pays de Dol et de la Baie du Mont Saint-Michel
CC Roche aux Fées Communauté
Communauté de communes de Saint-Méen Montauban
Communauté de communes du Val d'Ille-Aubigné
CC Vallons de Haute-Bretagne Communauté

See also
 Cantons of the Ille-et-Vilaine department
 Ille-et-Vilaine

References

Ille-et-Vilaine